Ian Wilson (born 8 August 1952) is a New Zealand cricketer. He played in eight first-class matches for Canterbury from 1977 to 1980.

See also
 List of Canterbury representative cricketers

References

External links
 

1952 births
Living people
New Zealand cricketers
Canterbury cricketers
Cricketers from Christchurch